The Jordan Rift Valley, also Jordan Valley  also called the Syro-African Depression, is an elongated depression located in modern-day Israel, Palestine, and Jordan. This geographic region includes the entire length of the Jordan River – from its sources, through the Hula Valley, the Korazim block, the Sea of Galilee, the (Lower) Jordan Valley, all the way to the Dead Sea, the lowest land elevation on Earth – and then continues through the Arabah depression, the Gulf of Aqaba whose shorelines it incorporates, until finally reaching the Red Sea proper at the Straits of Tiran.

History and physical features 

The Jordan Rift Valley was formed many millions of years ago in the Miocene epoch (23.8 – 5.3 Myr ago) when the Arabian Plate moved northward and then eastward away from Africa. One million years later, the land between the Mediterranean and the Jordan Rift Valley rose so that the sea water stopped flooding the area.

The geological and environmental evolution of the valley since its inception in the Oligocene can be seen in a variety of sedimentary and magmatic rock units, preserved as continuous sequences in the deeper basins. The outcropping formations around the basins represent alternating deposition and erosion phases.

Rising sharply to almost  in the west, and similarly in the east, the rift is a significant topographic feature over which a few narrow paved roads and difficult mountain tracks lead. The valley north of the Dead Sea has long been a site of agriculture because of water available from the Jordan River and numerous springs located on the valley's flanks.

Dead Sea Transform 

The plate boundary which extends through the valley is variously called the Dead Sea Transform (DST) or Dead Sea Rift. The boundary separates the Arabian Plate from the African Plate, connecting the divergent plate boundary in the Red Sea (the Red Sea Rift) to the East Anatolian Fault in Turkey.

The DST fault system is generally considered to be a transform fault that has accommodated a  northwards displacement of the Arabian Plate. This interpretation is based on observation of offset markers, such as river terraces, gullies and archaeological features, giving horizontal slip rates of several mm per year over the last few million years. GPS data give similar rates of present-day movement of the Arabian Plate relative to the Africa Plate. It has also been proposed that the fault zone is a rift system that is an incipient oceanic spreading center, the northern extension of the Red Sea Rift.

In 1033, the rift valley was struck by a magnitude 7.3 earthquake, believed to have been produced along the DST fault system. It caused widespread destruction, a tsunami, and killed 70,000 people.

Climate

See also 
 Geography of Israel
 Geography of Jordan
 Great Rift Valley

References

External links 

Valleys of Asia
.
Landforms of the Middle East
Cenozoic geology of Asia
Cenozoic rifts and grabens
Dead Sea
.
Geography of Palestine (region)
Landforms of Jordan
Valleys of the West Bank
Landforms of Western Asia
Levant
Regions of Israel
Rifts and grabens
Valleys of Israel
Depressions of Israel
Depressions of Jordan